Jotus is a spider genus of the family Salticidae (jumping spiders), native to Australia, New Zealand, and Indonesia. There are thought to be many as yet undescribed species in southern Australia.

Species
, the World Spider Catalog accepted the following species:
Jotus albimanus Baehr, Schubert & Harms, 2019 – Australia (New South Wales)
Jotus auripes L. Koch, 1881 (type species) – Australia (New South Wales, Victoria)
Jotus braccatus L. Koch, 1881 – Australia (Queensland)
Jotus debilis L. Koch, 1881 – Australia (New South Wales)
Jotus fortiniae Baehr, Schubert & Harms, 2019 – Australia (Queensland)
Jotus frosti Peckham & Peckham, 1901 – Australia (Victoria, South Australia)
Jotus insulanus Rainbow, 1920 – Australia (Lord Howe Island)
Jotus karllagerfeldi Baehr, Schubert & Harms, 2019 – Australia (Queensland)
Jotus maculivertex Strand, 1911 – Indonesia (Kei Islands)
Jotus minutus L. Koch, 1881 – Australia (Queensland)
Jotus moonensis Baehr, Schubert & Harms, 2019 – Australia (Queensland)
Jotus newtoni Baehr, Schubert & Harms, 2019 – Australia (Queensland)
Jotus ravus (Urquhart, 1893) – New Zealand
Jotus remus Otto & Hill, 2016 – Australia (New South Wales)

References

Salticidae
Spiders of Asia
Spiders of Australia
Salticidae genera
Taxa named by Ludwig Carl Christian Koch